The 1941 Troy State Red Wave football team represented Troy State Teachers College (now known as Troy University) as a member of the Alabama Intercollegiate Conference (AIC) during the 1941 college football season. Led by fifth-year head coach Albert Choate, the Red Wave compiled an overall record of 5–4, with a mark of 3–0 in AIC play, winning the conference title. Troy State had a record of 1–4 against SIAA opponents, placing 25th.

Schedule

References

Troy State
Troy State
Troy Trojans football seasons
Alabama Collegiate Conference football champion seasons
Troy State Red Wave football